Golfo de Morrosquillo Airport  is a commercial airport serving the Caribbean coast municipality of Tolú in the Sucre Department of Colombia. The airport is on the coast south of the town, and north approaches and departures are over the water.

The airport was refurbished in 2010 extending its terrain and runway. Currently, Aerolínea de Antioquia and SATENA are the only airlines that serve this airport.

Aerolínea de Antioquia is the most prominent airlines at the airport, operating Dornier 328s, and SATENA began operations in early March, 2017, operating ATR 42s.

Airport renovation
The Special Administrative Unit of Civil Aeronautics of Colombia invested 4,425,000,000 COP (US$2,500,000 app) to expand the airport in 2010.

Airlines and destinations

See also
Transport in Colombia
List of airports in Colombia

References

External links
OpenStreetMap - Tolú
OurAirports - Tolú
SkyVector - Tolú
FallingRain - Tolú Airport

Airports in Colombia
Buildings and structures in Sucre Department